Darughachi (Mongol form) or Basqaq (Turkic form) were originally designated officials in the Mongol Empire that were in charge of taxes and administration in a certain province. The plural form of the Mongolian word is darugha. They were sometimes referred to as governors.

History
This title was established under the rule of Genghis Khan from 1211. The Secret History of the Mongols relates that after the invasion and conquest of the Kipchaks and the Rus between 1237 and 1240, Ögödei placed daruγačin and tammačin to govern the peoples whose cities were Ornas, Saḳsīn, Bolghar and Kiev.

Under the Yuan Dynasty, the title of  Zhangguan replaced the former designation – there was one such official for each administrative subdivision, where functions of governor and chief of the armies were combined. This title was also given to a person at the head of a central government office. This charge usually fell to a Mongol, probably to a Semu, thus guaranteeing the preservation of power within the Mongols. Some other populations, however, could have an administrative title with close functions.

The texts of Yanghe mentoin that he should be paid a large sum of gold and silver when the Darugha Turfan was replaced.

The Turkic term  does not appear in Mongolian sources. They appear in the 13th-century soon after the Mongol Conquest but were withdrawn by 1328 and the Grand Prince of Vladimir (usually the Prince of Moscow) became the khan's tax collector and imperial son in law (kürgen), entrusted with gathering the dan''' or tribute from the Rus' principalities for the Golden Horde.

In the 13th century, chiefs of Mongol darughas were stationed in Vladimir and Baghdad. The Mongol Empire attempted to send darughachi to Goryeo in 1231, after the first (of six) invasions. According to some records, 72 darughachi were sent and the Mongol military garrisons were withdrawn. However, repeated rebellions and continued Goryeo resistance to Mongol dominion (the original darughachi that were stationed were all killed by Goryeo forces in the summer of 1232) made the stationing of darughachi difficult. While there are questions regarding the actual number of darughachi stationed, most reliable sources (including the Goryeo-sa) indicate that at least some darughachi were stationed in Goryeo for the duration of its vassaldom to the Mongol Empire. The extant record denoted 72 darughachi was itself a derivation of an older record that has been lost; Goryeo was too small a territory to merit so many darughachi; the names of none of the 72 darughachi remain, which is unusual considering the importance of their position. While further mention of the darughachi in Korea is scarce in extant sources; after peace was secured between Goryeo and the Mongol Empire in 1259 establishing Korea as a vassal to the Empire, the stationing of darughachi in Korea was likely a more stable proposition.

After 1921 the word  ('boss') (Khalkha for darugha) replaced the aristocratic noyan as the term for high-level officials in Mongolia.

See alsoDarugha''

References

Mongol Empire
History of Mongolia
Yuan dynasty
Medieval Russia